Michael Massey (born March 22, 1998) is an American professional baseball second baseman for the Kansas City Royals of Major League Baseball (MLB). He made his MLB debut in 2022.

Amateur career
Massey attended Brother Rice High School in Chicago, Illinois, and the University of Illinois, where he played college baseball for the Illinois Fighting Illini. As a freshman with Illinois in 2017, he started 51 games and batted .330 with six home runs and 36 runs batted in (RBIs). That summer, he played collegiate summer baseball with the Kenosha Kingfish of the Northwoods League. He started 53 games as a sophomore, hitting .326 with six home runs and 46 RBIs. He spent the summer of 2018 playing in the Cape Cod Baseball League for the Brewster Whitecaps.

As a junior in 2019, Massey dealt with a back injury for part of the season. He still appeared in 55 games in which he hit .317 with five home runs, 28 RBIs, and 14 stolen bases. After the season's end, he was selected by the Kansas City Royals in the fourth round of the 2019 Major League Baseball draft.

Professional career

Massey made his professional debut with the Burlington Royals of the Rookie-level Appalachian League, batting .272 with five home runs and 25 RBIs over 42 games. He did not play a minor league game in 2020 due to the cancellation of the minor league season due to the COVID-19 pandemic. Massey spent the 2021 season with the Quad Cities River Bandits of the High-A Central with whom he slashed .289/.351/.531 with 21 home runs, 87 RBIs, and 27 doubles over 99 games. He also was awarded the Gold Glove at second base. He was assigned to the Northwest Arkansas Naturals of the Double-A Texas League to begin the 2022 season. In mid-June, he was promoted to the Omaha Storm Chasers of the Triple-A International League.

On July 14, 2022, the Royals selected Massey's contract and promoted him to the major leagues. He made his MLB debut the next night as a pinch-hitter versus the Toronto Blue Jays at Rogers Centre, striking out in his only at-bat. He made his first major league start on July 16 versus the Blue Jays and recorded his first MLB hit, a single off of Max Castillo, in his first at-bat. He was optioned back to the minors on July 18, and called up to the major leagues once again on August 3 following the trade of starting second baseman Whit Merrifield.

Personal life
Massey's father, Keith, played college baseball at Illinois in the 1980s. Massey grew up a fan of the Chicago White Sox.

References

External links

Illinois Fighting Illini bio

1998 births
Living people
People from Palos Park, Illinois
Baseball players from Chicago
Major League Baseball second basemen
Kansas City Royals players
Illinois Fighting Illini baseball players
Brewster Whitecaps players
Burlington Royals players
Quad Cities River Bandits players
Northwest Arkansas Naturals players
Omaha Storm Chasers players